Willemspark (Amsterdam) is a neighborhood of Amsterdam, Netherlands. It is one of the most expensive neighborhoods of Amsterdam.

Neighbourhoods of Amsterdam
Amsterdam-Zuid